The 1994–95 FIBA Women's European Champions Cup was the 37th and second-to-last edition of FIBA Europe's international competition for women's basketball national champion clubs. It ran from 7 September 1994 to 23 March 1995.

Defending champion SG Comense won its second title beating defending PB Godella in a rematch of the 1993 and 1994 finals. Comense was the fifth (and last to date) Italian team to win the competition after Geas Basket, Fiat Torino, AS Vicenza and Libertas Trogylos. CSKA Moscow and US Valenciennes Olympic also reached the Final Four, with the Russians ranking third.

First qualifying round

Second qualifying round

Group stage

Group A

Group B

Quarter-finals

Final four
Cantù, Italy

Individual statistics

Points

Rebounds

Assists

References

Champions Cup
EuroLeague Women seasons